This is a list of fellows of the Royal Society elected in 1720.

Fellows
 Henry Beighton (d. 1743)
 Alexander Cuming (c. 1690–1775)
 Thomas Dereham (c. 1678–1739)
 Pierre des Maizeaux (?1672–1745)
 John Douglas (d. 1743)
 Henry Heathcote (d. 1727)
 Friedrich Hoffmann (1660–1742)
 Abel Ketelbey (c. 1676–1744)
 Richard Manningham (1690–1759)
 William Mathew (d. 1752)
 William North, 6th Baron North and 2nd Lord Grey (1678–1734)
 Jeffrey Palmer (?1700–1721)
 David Papillon (1691–1662)
 Zachary Pearce (1690–1774)
 Henry Pemberton (1694–1771)
 Giambattista Recanati (1687–1734)
 William Rutty (1687–?1730)
 Samuel Sanders (d. 1746)
 William Sherard (1659–1728)
 Oliver St John (c. 1691–1743)
 Charles Stuart (c. 1682–1770)
 John Warburton (1682–1759)

References

1720
1720 in science
1720 in England